State Route 111 (SR 111) is a north–south highway in Middle and East Tennessee. The road begins in Soddy-Daisy and ends north of Byrdstown in the community of Static, at the Tennessee/Kentucky state line.

Route description
The highway begins at an interchange with U.S. Route 27/SR 29 (US 27/SR 29) in Soddy-Daisy. SR 111 travels generally northwest as a controlled access highway before it crosses into Sequatchie County. The controlled-access sections of SR 111 are unusual, as they contain 70 mph speed limits, which are generally reserved for Interstate highways. It then proceeds over Walden Ridge and into the Sequatchie Valley, where it comes to an interchange with US 127 and starts a concurrency with SR 8 in Dunlap, where the freeway ends. The concurrency goes up the Cumberland Plateau, continuing as a 4-lane road, albeit without a dividing median or wide shoulders, and into the northern part of the county where it narrows to an improved 2-lane road and SR 8 splits off and continues to McMinnville. SR 111 turns north at this point and crosses into Van Buren County. Beyond this point, the entire road until passing Livingston is either a four-lane divided highway or a five-lane road with a continuous center turn lane, in both cases with wide, paved shoulders.

In Van Buren County, the highway travels through the small town of Spencer, passing just west of Fall Creek Falls State Park, and continues into White County at the Caney Fork River. In this area SR 111 runs a brief concurrency with SR 285. The highway then proceeds north as Harold "Mose" Sims Memorial Highway and joins the concurrency of US 70S/SR 1. The concurrency continues to the west side of Sparta, at which point the highways split up and SR 111 becomes controlled access again,  continuing north into Putnam County.

Entering Putnam County by crossing the Falling Water River, the highway runs a brief concurrency with SR 136 before continuing north and passing through eastern Cookeville, once again losing its status as a controlled-access highway. Here it intersects Interstate 40 (I-40) and US 70N as it turns north-northeastward and into the town of Algood. After passing Algood, SR 111 turns northeastward and enters Overton County.

In Overton County, SR 111 becomes Cookeville Highway and then Veterans Memorial Parkway as it approaches Livingston. It becomes a bypass around the northwest of town, known as Bradford Hicks Drive, before exiting Livingston as an improved two-lane highway and continuing northeast as Byrdstown Highway. It crosses into Pickett County and becomes Livingston Highway. Then, it crosses the Obey River, impounded as Dale Hollow Lake, and enters Byrdstown.

After bypassing the center of Byrdstown, the highway continues northeastward as Robert H. Roberts Memorial Highway before ending at US 127/SR 28 in Static, just yards from the Kentucky state line. From this intersection, US 127 runs northwestward to Albany, Kentucky, and southeastward toward Jamestown, Tennessee, while Kentucky Route 1076 continues northeastward to KY 696, which crosses Poplar Mountain in the direction of Monticello, Kentucky. If not for the mountain, this would be the straightest route along the western edge of the Cumberland Plateau from Byrdstown to Monticello. It has been suggested that TN 111 and parts of US 127, KY 90, US 27, KY 914, KY 80 and KY 461 be renumbered US 111 (a route that no longer exists) to create a clearly numbered route along the scenic western edge of the plateau, connecting Interstates 75, 40 and 24.

History
SR 111 existed by 1938, but only as a short portion of the current SR 111 route between the town of Spencer in Van Buren County and Doyle in White County and maintained this alignment at least through 1951.  By 1963, it had been extended south from Spencer to the SR 8 junction in Sequatchie County north of Cagle. Between 1975 and 1978, SR 111 was extended north to Cookeville replacing SR 42 in that section. Between 1987 and 1989 the highway was extended northward over the remainder of the path of SR 42 to Static. Between 1988 and 1994, the section between SR 8 in Dunlap and US 27 between Soddy-Daisy and Bakewell was built. This extension was four lanes on the downgrades of Walden Ridge, and two lanes elsewhere, with the intent of eventually expanding the entirety to four lanes. The section opened to traffic on December 13, 1994, and cost $96 million. This was expanded to a four lane controlled-access highway between 2000 and 2004, which included replacing the four-way intersection with US 127 with an overpass and interchange.

State Route 42

State Route 42 (SR 42) was the former designation of a state highway in Tennessee that ran from US 70S in Sparta north through Cookeville, and ending in the town of Static at US 127 near the Kentucky state line. The number was decommissioned when SR 111 was created. Except for a few bypasses, SR 111 follows the entire route of former SR 42.

Major intersections

See also

References

 
111
Transportation in Hamilton County, Tennessee
Transportation in Sequatchie County, Tennessee
Transportation in Van Buren County, Tennessee
Transportation in White County, Tennessee
Transportation in Putnam County, Tennessee
Transportation in Overton County, Tennessee
Transportation in Pickett County, Tennessee
Freeways in Tennessee
Appalachian Development Highway System